Ichchapuram is a town in the Srikakulam district of the Indian state of Andhra Pradesh. The town is located nearly 142 km from the district capital, Srikakulam. Ichchapuram municipality is the largest urban local body in the Srikakulam district. It had a population of 36,493 .

Geography 
It has an average elevation of 7 metres (22 feet). The town sits on the Bahuda river. The overall geographical area of the town is 27 hectares and the nearest town, Palasa, is 18 km away. Sonpur Beach is a 35-minute drive to the east. Ichchapuram's Maa Mangala temple, not to be confused with the more famous Maa Mangala Temple located in Odisha, is located in the north east quadrant of the municipality.

Demographics 
 census, the town had a population of 36,493, with 17,716 males above the age of 6, 18,777 females above the age of 6, and 4,004 children between the ages of 0 and 6. Ichapuram's average literacy rate is 71.12% with 23,105 literate individuals. The two primary languages of the municipality are Telugu and Odia.

Government and politics 
Ichchapuram municipality is classified by the Indian government as a 3rd grade municipality. Ichchapuram is an assembly constituency in Andhra Pradesh. Ashok Bendalam is the present MLA.

Transport 

National Highway 16, a part of Golden Quadrilateral highway network, bypasses the town. The Ichchapuram railway station is on the Howrah–Chennai main line.

Education 
There are several private schools in the town, including Vidhya Bharathi English medium school, Swarna Bharathi English medium school, Gnana Bharathi English medium school, and Ravindra Bharathi English medium school.

See also 
List of municipalities in Andhra Pradesh

References

External links 

Cities and towns in Srikakulam district
Mandal headquarters in Srikakulam district